Gustav Richard Kinn (10 June 1895 – 31 October 1978) was a Swedish long-distance runner. He competed in the marathon at the 1920, 1924 and 1928 Summer Olympics and finished in 17th, 8th and 25th place, respectively. Kinn won the national marathon title in  1917, 1919–22, 1924–26, 1928 and 1929.

References

External links
 

1895 births
1978 deaths
Athletes (track and field) at the 1920 Summer Olympics
Athletes (track and field) at the 1924 Summer Olympics
Athletes (track and field) at the 1928 Summer Olympics
Swedish male long-distance runners
Swedish male marathon runners
Olympic athletes of Sweden
Sportspeople from Dalarna County